Sin is a 2007 novel in stories by the Russian writer Zakhar Prilepin. 

This novel was published in 2007 in Vargius (Russia).

Prizes and awards
 The National Bestseller Prize 2008
 The Super Natsbest Prize 2011

References

External links
 Sin - official website
 Zahar Prilepin - official website

Novels by Zakhar Prilepin
2007 novels
21st-century Russian novels